Luigi Vertemati (11 March 1891 – 15 October 1976) was an Italian racing cyclist. He rode in the 1922 Tour de France.

References

External links
 

1891 births
1976 deaths
Italian male cyclists
Place of birth missing
Cyclists from the Province of Monza e Brianza